Allan Maxwell (2 April 1869 – 1956) was a Scottish footballer who played in the Football League for Darwen, Everton and Stoke.

Career
Maxwell was born in Motherwell (though resided mainly in Hamilton in his youth) and played for Cambuslang in the inaugural season of the Scottish Football League, also featuring in the Glasgow FA v Sheffield FA challenge fixture, before joining English club Everton in 1891, along with goalkeeper Archibald Pinnell.

He spent three years at Everton during the period when they moved from Anfield to Goodison Park, scoring 15 goals, and helped them reach the 1893 FA Cup Final where he played in a 1–0 defeat to Wolverhampton Wanderers. He joined Darwen in 1893 and spent another three years with the struggling Lancashire club before he was subject to a bizarre transfer to Stoke: instead of requesting an amount of money for Maxwell, Darwen instead wanted Stoke to provide them with a new set of wrought iron gates. He spent two seasons with Stoke, making 37 appearances and scoring six goals, before returning to Scotland with St Bernard's. He soon emigrated to the United States in 1902 and remained living there until his death.

Career statistics
Source:

References

Scottish footballers
Stoke City F.C. players
Darwen F.C. players
Everton F.C. players
English Football League players
Scottish Football League players
1869 births
1956 deaths
St Bernard's F.C. players
Footballers from Motherwell
Cambuslang F.C. players
Association football forwards
Scottish emigrants to the United States
FA Cup Final players